Kasra Mehdipournejad (born on 26 December 1992 in Isfahan, Iran) is an Iranian Taekwondo practitioner who lives in Berlin, Germany since 2017.Kasra Participated at the World and European Taekwondo Championships and Olympic qualification 2021 as a refugee athlete and he was able to win medals in various international olympic ranking tournaments

Early life 

He started Taekwondo at the age of 10 and became the champion of Iran several times and was invited to taekwondo national team of Iran. He won the Iranian Taekwondo Super League twice with Azad university team. He left Iran in 2017 and applied for asylum in Germany.His first international competition was Deutsch Open and he won a Gold medal in -74 kg category (after 6 fights) and 10 points for the Olympic rankings.

In 2019, he participated in World Taekwondo Championships in Manchester as a refugee athlete and succeeded to hold scholarship of  International Olympic committee refugee team for Tokyo Olympic Games.

He will participate in European qualification for Tokyo Olympic Games.

Medal records 

 2019
 : Polish Open Warsaw Cup
 : Austrian Open
 2018
 : Dutch Open Taekwondo Championships
 : Belgian Open 2018 (Kyorugi Divisions)
 : German Open
: Austrian Open
 : Luxembourg Open (LuxOpen)

References

External links
Kasra Mehdipournejad in TaekwondoData.com
 Kasra Mehdipournejad on Instagram

Living people
1992 births
Sportspeople from Isfahan
Iranian male taekwondo practitioners
20th-century Iranian people
21st-century Iranian people